St. Ignatius Cathedral, also known as the Xujiahui Cathedral or the Xujiahui Catholic Church, is a Roman Catholic cathedral, located in Xujiahui, Shanghai, China. Since 1960, St Ignatius has been the seat of the Bishop of Shanghai and the headquarters of the Roman Catholic Diocese of Shanghai. It was designed in the Neo-Gothic style by William Doyle and built between 1906 and 1910.

History 

The first church at Zikawei (now spelled Xujiahui as per the Mandarin pronunciation) was built in 1851. A medium-sized, Greek style church was built in 1851 (demolished in the 1980s to make way for the new headquarters of the Shanghai Diocese).

With the growth of Zikawei as a center of Catholicism, a new, larger church was commissioned. Designed by English architect William Doyle, and built by French Jesuits between 1906 and 1910, it is said to have once been known as "the grandest church in the Far East." It can accommodate 2,500 worshippers at the same time.

In 1960, after the Communist takeover of Shanghai and the arrest and imprisonment of the leaders of the Shanghai Diocese, the cathedra of the Bishop of Shanghai was moved from the older but smaller Cathedral of St Francis Xavier at Dongjiadu to St Ignatius, and Zikawei became the headquarters of the Roman Catholic Diocese of Shanghai. Ignatius Kung Pin-Mei, Bishop of Shanghai, had been arrested in 1955 and sentenced to life imprisonment in 1960, so the move to Zikawei occurred under Aloysius Zhang Jiashu, the Bishop of Shanghai according to the Chinese government-approved "Catholic" church.

In 1966, at the opening of the Cultural Revolution, Red Guards from Beijing vandalized the cathedral, tearing down its spires and ceiling, and smashing its roughly 300 square meters of stained glass. Red Guards also beat up priests and nuns at the church. Powerless to resist, Bishop Aloysius Zhang Jiashu knelt at the altar and prayed until he was dragged away – for the duration of the Cultural Revolution, he was "sent down" for labour, repairing umbrellas and washing bottles. For the next ten years the cathedral served as a state-owned grain warehouse.

In 1978 the cathedral was re-opened, and the spires were restored in the early 1980s.

In 1989, the first-ever Chinese language Mass was celebrated in St. Ignatius by order of Bishop Aloysius Jin Luxian. The celebrants were Father Thomas Law of Hong Kong, Father Joseph Zen of Hong Kong (later named bishop and Cardinal of Hong Kong), and Father Edward Malatesta, S.J., of San Francisco.

The building's restoration is continuing. In 2002, Wo Ye, a Beijing-born artist, and Father Thomas Lucas, a Jesuit from the University of San Francisco, began a five-year project to replace the cathedral's stained glass windows. The new windows incorporate Chinese characters and iconography, and were first unveiled in time for the 2010 World Expo in Shanghai.

Since 2014, the sculpture of Holy Mary, Chinese Empress, created by the Spanish sculptor Antonio Jesús Yuste Navarro, is venerated there.

Location 
The cathedral is located near the Xujiahui Metro station exit 3.

Anecdotes 
The cathedral was featured in the opening scenes of Steven Spielberg's 1987 film Empire of the Sun. Although in fact it is not the cathedral in the original book Empire of the Sun by J. G. Ballard, who attended the school at the Anglican Holy Trinity Church in Shanghai.

See also 

 List of Catholic cathedrals in China
 Bishop Ma Daqin
 List of Jesuit sites

References

External links 
 

Roman Catholic churches completed in 1910
Shanghai
20th-century Roman Catholic church buildings in China
Major National Historical and Cultural Sites in Shanghai
Cathedrals in Shanghai
Roman Catholic cathedrals in China
Roman Catholic churches in Shanghai
Landmarks in Shanghai
1910 establishments in China
Xuhui District